Billie Matthews (March 15, 1930 – December 7, 2001) was an American football coach who was the Offensive Coordinator of the Indianapolis Colts from 1985 to 1986. He was also the San Francisco 49ers Running Backs coach from 1979 to 1982, the Philadelphia Eagles Running Backs coach from 1983 to 1984, the Kansas City Chiefs Running Backs coach from 1987 to 1988, and the Detroit Lions defensive backs and running backs coach from 1989 to 1994.

Early life
Billie Matthews was born in Houston Texas on March 15, 1930.

Coaching career

Kashmere High School
His first coaching position came as the head coach at Kashmere High School. He was the head coach for 12 seasons, from 1959 to 1970.

UCLA Bruins
Matthews got a job as the defensive backs coach for the UCLA Bruins in 1971. He became the running backs coach the next year and was the coach until 1978.

San Francisco 49ers
Matthews got his first NFL coaching job as the Running Backs coach for the San Francisco 49ers. He was coach when they won Super Bowl XVI. He was coach from 1979 to 1982.

Philadelphia Eagles
He was the running backs coach for the Philadelphia Eagles from 1983 to 1984.

Indianapolis Colts
From 1985 to 1986, he was the offensive coordinator and running backs coach for the Indianapolis Colts.

Kansas City Chiefs
From 1987 to 1988, he was the running backs coach for the Kansas City Chiefs.

Detroit Lions
He was the defensive backs coach from 1989 to 1991 for the Detroit Lions. He switched to running backs coach from 1992 to 1994. For three years, he was the running backs coach of Barry Sanders.

References

1930 births
2001 deaths
San Francisco 49ers coaches
Philadelphia Eagles coaches
Detroit Lions coaches
Kansas City Chiefs coaches